Joanna, Duchess of Brabant (24 June 1322 – 1 December 1406), also known as Jeanne, was a ruling Duchess (Duke) of Brabant from 1355 until her death. She was duchess of Brabant until the occupation of the duchy by her brother-in-law Louis II of Franders. Following her death, the rights to the duchy of Brabant went to her great-nephew Antoine.

Life
Joanna was born 24 June 1322, the daughter of John III, Duke of Brabant and Marie d'Évreux. Her first marriage, in 1334, was to William II, Count of Hainaut (1307–1345), who subsequently died in battle and their only son William died young, thus foiling the project of unifying their territories.

Joanna's second marriage was to Wenceslaus of Luxemburg. The famous document, the foundation of the rule of law in Brabant called the Blijde Inkomst ("Joyous Entry"), was arrived at in January 1356, in order to assure Joanna and her consort peaceable entry into their capital and to settle  the inheritance of the Duchy of Brabant on her "natural heirs", who were Joanna's sisters, they being more acceptable to the burghers of Brabant than rule by the House of Luxembourg. The document was seen as a dead letter, followed by a military incursion in 1356 into Brabant by Louis II of Flanders, who had married Margaret, Joanna's younger sister, and considered himself Duke of Brabant by right of his wife. 

With the Duchy overrun by Louis' forces, Joanna and Wencelaus signed the humiliating Treaty of Ath, which ceded Mechelen and Antwerp to Louis.  By August 1356 Joanna and Wencelaus had called upon the Emperor, Charles IV to support them by force of arms. Charles met at Maastricht with the parties concerned, including representatives of the towns, and all agreed to nullify certain terms of the Blijde Inkomst, to satisfy the Luxembourg dynasty. The duchy continued to deteriorate with Wencelaus's defeat and capture at the battle of Baesweiler in 1371.

On Joanna's death, by agreement the Duchy passed to her great-nephew Antoine, the second son of her niece Margaret III, Countess of Flanders.

Tomb

Her tomb was not erected in the Carmelite church in Brussels until the late 1450s; it was paid for in 1459 by her sister's great-grandson, Philip the Good. Though it was destroyed in the course of the French Revolutionary Wars, its appearance has been  reconstructed from drawings and descriptions by  Lorne Campbell, who concluded that the tomb was an afterthought, providing an inexpensive piece of propaganda for Philip's dynastic rights.

See also 
Dukes of Brabant family tree

References

Sources

Brabant, Joanna, Duchess of
Brabant, Joanna, Duchess of
Dukes of Brabant
Dukes of Luxembourg
Countesses of Luxembourg
Countesses of Holland
Countesses of Hainaut
Joanna
14th century in the duchy of Brabant
14th-century women rulers
15th-century women rulers
14th-century women of the Holy Roman Empire
15th-century women of the Holy Roman Empire
es:Juana de Brabante#top